998 Fifth Avenue is a luxury cooperative located on Fifth Avenue at the northeast corner of East 81st Street in the Upper East Side of Manhattan, New York City.

Design
The , 12-story building was designed by the architectural firm of McKim, Mead & White and built by James T. Lee (Jacqueline Kennedy Onassis’ grandfather) in 1910–1912. The Italian Renaissance Palazzo-style structure is sheathed entirely in limestone except for a large matching terra cotta cornice and an inner court,  square, faced with off-white brick. Unlike nearby buildings, there are no penthouses.

Balustrade stringcourses define the division of the base from the body and the body from the top. Each window above the stringcourse is capped with a pediment or cornice. Panels of escutcheons and light-yellow marble decorate the structure horizontally at four-floor intervals.

The lobby walls and ceiling, and hallway walls are made of tan Bottocino marble. The elevators have bronze grilles. Originally, the apartment interiors were decorated with neoclassical and Tudor-Jacobean Revival motifs.

Apartments
The original design included 18 apartments, the building contained 15 units upon opening, as some of the upper floors were combined into larger units. Floors 5 and 9 have ceiling heights of 11.5 feet, while the remaining have 10.5 feet. The ground floor has roughly 13-foot ceilings. Floors 2-8 contain 7 simplexes, each  with 15 rooms; these apartments contain 4 bedrooms, including a large corner master. On the side street floors, 3-8 contain 3 duplex units, each . The upper 4 floors originally contained 3 apartments. There are 2 main elevators for the tenants and 1 service elevator for the staff; also a service stair.

History
The building was the first super-luxury apartment house on Fifth Avenue. The architect was given unlimited permission to create whatever was necessary to lure the very wealthy into the building. At the time of its construction, the upper class lived in mansions and townhouses on the Upper East Side. Grand apartments had been built before, but those were occupied by businessmen and the nouveau riche, not the upper crust of American society. During its construction, it was viewed as a remote and unpopular tower that invaded the city's best residential sections.

When 998 Fifth Avenue was built, the Metropolitan Museum of Art's Fifth Avenue building, across the street, was much smaller and attracted far fewer people. Among the amenities the building had were wall safes, storage rooms in the basement and a large number of wood-burning fireplaces, as well as two-foot thick fireproof walls. Unlike the high-class apartment houses on the West Side, this building did not have a name.  It was originally, like the vast majority of pre-war buildings, a rental. The rents were much higher compared to all the other buildings in the city: the largest units were leased for roughly $25,000, while the smaller lower floor units for $10,000–12,000. Ultimately the building's broker, Douglas Elliman, found over 100 prospects and 998 Fifth Avenue rented right away. In 1912, the magazine Architecture called it the most remarkable thing of its kind in America.

The fact that so many wealthy people rented apartments signaled the shift from the private houses to luxury buildings. The "servant problem" (fewer people willing to go into service, especially for the low wages and long hours demanded by middle-class families) and the increasing time spent by the rich outside the city, the automobile and increasing taxes also favored this shift. In less than 20 years since the building's opening, over 90% of the wealthy people in New York lived in apartments. At the time of its opening in 1912, only 5% occupied apartments. The building cost roughly $3 million (including the land).

998 Fifth Avenue was converted to a cooperative in 1953 and is one of the most selective pre-war cooperatives in New York City.  It is thought to be one of the four best apartment houses on the avenue (alongside 820, 834, and 960 Fifth Avenue) and 10 best in the city. The apartments are rarely advertised and sell, depending on square footage or view, for $20 to $40 million. The building is one of the most storied on the "Gold Coast," and has been home to many well-known residents. The Astor, Guggenheim, Morton, Vanderbilt, Root, and other prominent families have lived at 998 Fifth Avenue.

Tenants

 Len Blavatnik
Elihu Root
 Watson Bradley Dickerman, president of the New York Stock Exchange in the 1890s
 George B. Fearing, a railroad investor and the president after 1916 of the Knickerbocker Club, a men's club at 62nd and Fifth
 Levi P. Morton, vice president of the United States under Benjamin Harrison from 1889 to 1893 and later governor of New York in 1895 and 1896
 Murry Guggenheim, a financier and mining operator who took the largest apartment 
 Victor Morawetz 
 Ludwig Dreyfus
 Edson Bradley
 E. Felsenheld
 Thomas A. James
 Lewis L. Clark
 Sylvia Green Wilks, heir of Hetty Green

References

Condominiums and housing cooperatives in Manhattan
Renaissance architecture in the United States
Residential buildings completed in 1912
1912 establishments in New York City
Upper East Side
Fifth Avenue
McKim, Mead & White buildings